Peter Jeffrey Leroy Dujon (born 28 May 1956) is a retired West Indian cricketer and current commentator.

He was the wicket-keeper for the West Indies cricket team of the 1980s, an athletic presence behind the stumps as well as a competent middle order batsman.

Dujon attended Wolmer's Schools. Dujon made his first-class debut in 1974, and Test debut in 1981. During his nineteen-year career, Dujon played 200 first-class matches for Jamaica and the West Indies. He scored nearly 10,000 runs at an average approaching 40 runs per innings, an impressive statistic when compared with other specialist wicket-keepers over time, as well as completing 447 catches and 22 stumpings. In total, he won 81 Test caps for the West Indies and was never a part of any losing series. 

Dujon was one of five Wisden Cricketers of the Year in 1989 and since retiring as a player in 1992, has worked as assistant coach to the West Indies national team and in development of young cricket players in his native Jamaica.

Career highlights

Tests 
Test Debut: vs Australia, Melbourne, 1981–1982
Last Test: vs England, The Oval, 1991
Dujon's best Test score of 139 was made against Australia, Perth, 1984–1985

One-day internationals 
ODI Debut: vs Australia, Adelaide, 1981–1982
Last ODI: vs India, Sharjah, 1991
Dujon's best ODI score of 82 not out was made against Australia, Melbourne, 1983–1984

References

External links 

HowSTAT! statistical profile on Jeff Dujon

West Indies One Day International cricketers
West Indies Test cricketers
West Indian cricket captains
Sportspeople from Kingston, Jamaica
Jamaican cricketers
Jamaica cricketers
Wisden Cricketers of the Year
West Indian cricket commentators
1956 births
Living people
Cricketers at the 1983 Cricket World Cup
Cricketers at the 1987 Cricket World Cup
M Parkinson's World XI cricketers
Wicket-keepers